Piscu is a commune in Galați County, Western Moldavia, Romania. It is composed of two villages, Piscu and Vameș.

References

Communes in Galați County
Localities in Western Moldavia